Jackie Vernold Shipp (born March 19, 1962) is an American football coach and former player. Shipp was the defensive line coach for the Oklahoma Sooners football team until his departure in the 2013 offseason. He had been on the Sooners' coaching staff since the arrival of Bob Stoops in 1999. He was the defensive line coach at Arizona State from 2013-2015, and was the defensive line coach at the University of Missouri for part of the 2016 season.

Shipp played high school football in Stillwater, Oklahoma where he was raised. He played college football at the University of Oklahoma. Shipp holds the all-time OU record for tackles in a single game with 22 and tackles in a single season with 189 (12 games). He is second in career tackles to Daryl Hunt.

He played six seasons in the NFL for the Miami Dolphins (1984–1988) and the Los Angeles Raiders (1989).

References

External links
 Nevada profile

1962 births
Living people
Alabama Crimson Tide football coaches
American football linebackers
Arizona State Sun Devils football coaches
Central Missouri Mules football coaches
Green Bay Packers coaches
Los Angeles Raiders players
Louisiana–Monroe Warhawks football coaches
Miami Dolphins players
Minnesota Vikings coaches
Missouri Tigers football coaches
Nevada Wolf Pack football coaches
Oklahoma Sooners football coaches
Oklahoma Sooners football players
People from Stillwater, Oklahoma
Players of American football from Oklahoma
Southern Illinois Salukis football coaches
Sportspeople from Muskogee, Oklahoma
Trinity Valley Cardinals football coaches
University of Oklahoma alumni
UT Martin Skyhawks football coaches
Langston Lions football coaches